Aalener Jazzfest is one of the top five jazz festivals in Germany. It is held annually on the second weekend in November in Aalen and has about 13,000 visitors annually. Individual concerts in the spring and summer, add to the musical offerings; there are a total of approximately 25 concerts per year. From the beginning, the festival was marked by stylistic openness, accepting jazz fusion, classic hard bop, jazz funk, soul, blues, African music, jazz and world music at the heart of the program. The Aalen Jazz Festival always offers a stage for talent or for musicians who for years have disappeared from the spotlight. Among the sponsors of the Aalen Jazzfest are companies and institutions such as the City of Aalen, various newspapers and utilities.

History
The organization body of the festival, the Aalen Kulturinitiative Association, was established in 1989 and today has about 200 members. Since 2008, the artistic director of the festival has been Ingo Hug. The first Aalen Jazz Festival in 1990 offered an ambitious program with musicians such as Heinz Sauer, Walter Wolfman Washington, Jasper van't Hof, Bob Malach and Eddie Harris. A year later, jazz legend Miles Davis played his last European concert on the 2nd Aalen Jazz Festival. Since, Dave Brubeck, Herbie Hancock, Fats Domino, B.B King, Buddy Guy, Al Jarreau, Van Morrison and Marianne Faithfull appeared at the festival, among others. The main venue is the Aalen City Hall which hosts the big concerts. Smaller venues include the artist's hotel and piano bar. In July 2008, shortly before his death, the late guitarist Hiram Bullock played more than ten times at the festival. He played in spontaneous jam sessions at the piano bar.

Notable past performers

 Dave Brubeck
 Albert Mangelsdorff
 Jim Hall
 David Murray
 McCoy Tyner
 Mike Stern
Buddy Guy
Van Morrison
 James Carter
Miles Davis
 Jan Garbarek
 Mousse T.
 Take 6
 Dianne Reeves
 Archie Shepp
 Dieter Ilg
 The Crusaders
 Maceo Parker
 Joachim Kühn
 Hiram Bullock
 Jimi Tenor
 Esbjörn Svensson Trio
 Joo Kraus
 Kool & the Gang
 Steffen Schorn
 Marianne Faithfull
 Herbie Hancock
 Branford Marsalis
 Gary Moore
 Lizz Wright
 Bireli Lagrene
 Mario Bauza
 Peter Weniger
 Johnny Griffin
 Ron Carter
 Bugge Wesseltoft
 John Scofield
 Charlie Mariano
 Roy Ayers
 Chico Freeman
 Dr. John
 Al Jarreau
 B.B. King
 Ray Charles
 Fats Domino
 Roy Hargrove
 Jan Delay & Disko No. 1
 Tortured Soul

References

External links

Official site
Aalener Jazzfest Deutsches Musikinformationszentrum 
Interview / Aalener Jazzfest setzt auf die nationale Karte (20th festival) tagblatt.de 25 October 2011 

Jazz festivals in Germany